Comostola pyrrhogona is a moth of the family Geometridae described by Francis Walker in 1866. It is found in the Indo-Australian tropics from India, Sri Lanka to Taiwan, and east to Vanuatu, New Caledonia, northern Australia and Norfolk Island.

Description
The wingspan is about 15–18 mm. Hindwings with veins 3 and 4 stalked. Antennae of male bipectinated (comb like on both sides) to two-thirds length. Palpi with second and third joints long and slender. Forewings with straight discocellulars. Veins 3, 4 and 6 to 11 stalked. Female pale bluish. Head rufous. A rufous dorsal stripe found on vertex of thorax and abdomen. Forewings with costa, and both wings with the outer margin are orange reddish, with black scales and spots irrorated (sprinkled) with silver. Ventral side whitish. Male genitalia include a slender spine enfolded in the sacculus.

References

External links

Moths of Asia

Hemitheini
Moths described in 1866